This is a timeline documenting events of Jazz in the year 1931.

Events

Standards

Deaths

 June
 14 – Jimmy Blythe, jazz and boogie woogie pianist (born 1901).

 July
 4 – Buddie Petit, jazz cornetist (born 1897).
 23 – Jimmy Harrison, American jazz trombonist (born 1900).

 August
 6 – Bix Beiderbecke, American jazz cornetist, jazz pianist, and composer (born 1903).

 November
 4 – Buddy Bolden, cornetist (born 1877).

Births

 January
 1 – Rose Brennan, Irish singer.
 2 – Frank Marocco, American piano-accordionist (died 2012).
 3 – John Jenkins, American saxophonist (died 1993).
 5
 Alfred Brendel, Austrian pianist, poet and author.
 Dizzy Reece, Jamaican trumpeter.
 6 – Keith Christie, English trombonist (died 1980).
 9 – Carson Smith, American upright bassist (died 1997).
 12 – Roland Alphonso, Jamaican tenor saxophonist (died 1998).
 14 – Caterina Valente, Italian singer, guitarist, dancer, and actress.
 19 – Horace Parlan, American pianist and composer (died 2017).
 20 – Hachidai Nakamura, Japanese songwriter and pianist (died 1992).
 22 – Sam Cooke, American singer and songwriter (died 1964).
 23 – Gianni Coscia, Italian accordionist.
 30 – Gene Gammage, American drummer.

 February
 6 – John Pisano, American guitarist.
 11
 Bobby Lamb, Irish trombonist.
 Lionel Batiste, American singer and drummer (died 2012).
 12 – Walt Groller, American accordionist.

 March
 4 – Sonya Hedenbratt, Swedish singer and actress (died 2001).
 11 – Allan Ganley, English drummer (died 2008).
 15
 D. J. Fontana, American drummer (died 2018).
 Theo Bophela, South African band leader, composer, pianist, arranger, and music educator (died 2017).
 17 – Karel Velebný, Czech vibraphonist, pianist, and saxophonist (died 1989).
 25 – Paul Motian, American drummer and percussionist (died 2011).

 April
 4 – Jake Hanna, American drummer (died 2010).
 17 – David Axelrod, American composer and producer (died 2017).
 18 – Willie Pickens, American pianist (died 2017).
 22 – Joe Cuba, Puerto Rican-American conga drummer (died 2009).
 27 – Krzysztof Komeda, Polish film composer and pianist (died 1969).
 29 – Lonnie Donegan, Scottish guitarist, singer, and songwriter (died 2002).
 30 – Dick Twardzik, American pianist (died 1955).

 May
 1 – Ira Sullivan, American trumpeter, flugelhornist, flautist, and saxophonist (died 2020).
 2 – Richard Holmes, American organist (died 1991).
 4
 Ed Cassidy, American drummer (died 2012).
 Richard Williams, American trumpeter (died 1985).
 5 – Monique Albert, French singer.
 7 – Teresa Brewer, American singer (died 2007).
 9 – Raymond Berthiaume, Canadian singer (died 2009).
 11 – Freddie Roach, American Hammond B3 organist (died 1980).
 14 – Alvin Lucier, American composer of experimental music and sound installations.
 16 – Walt Dickerson, American vibraphonist (died 2008).
 17
 Dewey Redman, American saxophonist (died 2006).
 Jackie McLean, American alto saxophonist (died 2006).
 20 – Louis Smith, American trumpeter (died 2016)
 27 – Diz Disley, Anglo-Canadian guitarist (died 2010).
 31 – Dick Garcia, American guitarist.

 June
 2 – Ronnie Bedford, American drummer (died 2014).
 7 – Mike Pratt, English actor, musician, songwriter, and screenwriter (died 1976).
 8 – Louis Albert, French singer.
 10 – João Gilberto, Brazilian singer, songwriter, and guitarist (died 2019).
 13 – Georges Arvanitas, French pianist and organist (died 2005).
 14 – Junior Walker, American saxophonist (died 1995).
 17 – Dominic Frontiere, American composer, arranger, and accordionist (died 2017).
 19 – Phil Bates, English upright bassist.
 30 – Andrew Hill, American pianist and composer (died 2007).

 July
 6 – Della Reese, American singer (died 2017).
 11 – Tab Hunter, American actor, singer, and author (died 2018).
 13 – Long John Hunter, American guitarist, singer, and songwriter (died 2016).
 21
 Plas Johnson, American tenor saxophonist.
 Sonny Clark, American pianist (died 1963).
 26 – Patti Bown, American pianist and singer (died 2008).
 31 – Kenny Burrell, American guitarist.

 August
 15 – Terry Pollard, American pianist and vibraphonist (died 2009).
 17 – Derek Smith, British pianist (died 2016).
 20
 Alain Goraguer, French pianist.
 Frank Capp, American drummer (died 2017).

 September
 1 – Willie Ruff, American French hornist and upright bassist.
 2 – Clifford Jordan, American tenor saxophonist (died 1993).
 5 – Richie Powell, American pianist (died 1956).
 7 – Makanda Ken McIntyre, American saxophonist (died 2001).
 8 – Marion Brown, American saxophonist and ethnomusicologist (died 2010).
 10 – Franco Manzecchi, Italian drummer (died 1979).
 16 – Jan Johansson, Swedish pianist (died 1968).
 27 – Thandi Klaasen, South African singer (pancreatic cancer) (born 1931).
 28 – John Gilmore, American saxophonist (died 1995).

 October
 14 – Duško Gojković, Serbian trumpeter and composer.
 15 – Freddy Cole, American singer and pianist (died 2020).
 27 – Sonny Dallas, American bassist and singer (died 2009).
 28 – Harold Battiste, American saxophonist, pianist, and composer (died 2015).

 November
 1 – Leon Spencer, American organist (died 2012).
 2 – Phil Woods, American alto saxophonist and clarinetist (died 2015).
 5 – Harold McNair, Jamaican saxophonist and flautist (died 1971).
 17 – Wayne Andre, American trombonist (died 2003).
 23 – Gloria Lynne, American singer (died 2013).
 25 – Nat Adderley, American trumpeter (died 2000).
 30 – Jack Sheldon, American trumpeter, singer, and actor (died 2019).

 December
 1
 Jimmy Lyons, American saxophonist (died 1986).
 Johnny Răducanu, Romanian pianist (died 2011).
 2 – Wynton Kelly, Jamaican-American pianist and composer (died 1971).
 14 – Phineas Newborn Jr., American pianist (died 1989).
 21 – David Baker, American symphonic jazz composer (died 2016).
 24 – Ray Bryant, American pianist and composer (died 2011).
 27 – Walter Norris, American pianist and composer (died 2011).
 31 – Gil Mellé, American saxophonist and film composer (died 2004).

References

External links
 History Of Jazz Timeline: 1931 at All About Jazz

Jazz, 1931 In
Jazz by year